Hon. Joshua Aduma Owuor is a Kenyan politician and lawyer. He is currently the Member of Parliament for Nyakach Constituency, serving since 2013 after being re-elected for another five-year term in the 2017 general elections.

Education
Aduma joined Kabete Primary School for his primary education in 1967, then proceeded to Nyabondo Boys Boarding Primary School. He later attended Onjiko High School for A-levels, then to Ambira Boys for O-Levels. In 1985, he joined University of Nairobi for LLB, then KSL for PGD.

Career 
Aduma is a trained lawyer and has worked as town clerk for several municipalities, including Bondo, Kisumu, and Garrissa. He has been City Hall Director of Nairobi.

Political career 
Aduma was first elected as a member of parliament for Nyakach Constituency in 2013 on the ODM ticket.

References 

Kenyan politicians
Year of birth missing (living people)
Living people
Place of birth missing (living people)
20th-century Kenyan lawyers
21st-century Kenyan lawyers
Members of the 11th Parliament of Kenya
Members of the 12th Parliament of Kenya
Members of the 13th Parliament of Kenya
21st-century Kenyan politicians